Dune Sar (also Romanized as Dūne Sar; also known as Dūneh Sar) is a village in Gatab-e Shomali Rural District, Gatab District, Babol County, Mazandaran Province, Iran. At the 2006 census, its population was 1,776, in 456 families.

References 

Populated places in Babol County